Pius Asante Yeboah (born 9 September 1999) is a Ghanaian professional footballer who plays as a forward for Ghanaian Premier League side Aduana Stars.

Career 
Yeboah joined Aduana Stars in January 2018. He made his debut during the 2019 GFA Normalization Committee Special Competition. On 31 March 2020, he made his debut in a 1–0 loss to Kumasi Asante Kotoko, in the process coming on in the 71st minute for Yahaya Mohammed. He made 6 league appearances that season. He played 9 league matches and scored 1 goal during the 2019–20 Ghana Premier League season before it was cancelled as a result of the COVID-19 pandemic in June 2020. In November 2020, he made the squad for the 2020–21 season as the league was set to restart in November 2020.

References

External links 

 
 

Living people
1999 births
Association football forwards
Ghanaian footballers
Aduana Stars F.C. players
Ghana Premier League players